Chinatichampsus is an extinct genus of crocodilian from the Devil's Graveyard Formation of Texas, specifically the Dalquest Desert Research Site. It is a monotypic genus, containing only the type species Chintanichampsus wilsonorum. A single specimen, TMM 45911–1, was first discovered in 2010. Chinatichampsus is the most basal Eocene caimanine, dating to between 42.8 and 41.5 million years ago, and is considered to be more basal than Protocaiman.

History of discovery 
The holotype of Chinatichampsus, TMM 45911–1, was discovered in 2010, in the Midwestern State University's Dalquest Desert Research Site. Strata from this locality are assigned to the Devil's Graveyard Formation, and the conglomeratic sandstones in which TM 45911-1 was discovered have been dated to between 42.8 and 41.5 million years ago. This corresponds to the late Uintan–early Duchesnean faunal stages. The fossil locality in which it was discovered has been nicknamed "Crocolicious".

The generic name of Chinatichampsus is derived from the Chinati Mountains and the Greek champsus (crocodile). The specific epithet honours Cornelia and Samuel Wilson, the discoverers of the holotype specimen.

Description 
[[File:Chinatichampsus side view.jpg|thumb|left|Right lateral view of Chinatichampsus wilsonorum'''s skull.]]
The holotype specimen of Chinatichampsus consists of a cranium, lacking most of the left dorsal surface. The left premaxilla is missing, and most of the left side of the cranium, as well as the right premaxilla, right nasal and right prefrontal, are also entirely absent. Though no parts of the postcranial skeleton were recovered, its describers hypothesize that it is a morphologically mature individual, specifically one older than two years of age, due to the size of the cranium and the proportions of the cranial fenestrae.

None of the external bone of the left maxilla remains, and only the medial surface of the large third or fourth left maxillary tooth and traces of the posterior maxillary alveoli are present. Remnants of matrix infillings of the nasal passage and maxillary sinus are visible, though. The right maxilla does preserve most of its external surface, though the outermost bony surface is either missing or crushed. At the posteromedial intersection of the premaxillary-maxillary suture with the nasal is a prominent crest, differing from the preorbital and rostral ridges observed in other caimanines in that it is oriented anteroposteriorly, rather than anterolaterally or mediolaterally.

Most of the dorsal surfaces of the relatively short and wide nasals are entirely missing. Along the cranium's midline are paired molds of the grooved ventral surfaces of the nasals. The anteriorly elongated nasals appear to have tapered slightly towards their anterior articulations with the maxillae and premaxillae. Though the anteriormost portion of the cranium is not very well-preserved, it seems there was at least a slight projection of the nasals beyond the posterior extent of the naris. Whether an internarial bar would have entirely bisected the nares is unclear.

Between 13 and 15 maxillary teeth are preserved. The number of maxillary teeth and their positions is ambiguous due to the position of the maxillary-premaxillary suture and the nature of a small hole at the posterior end of the maxillary tooth row. Assuming the largest preserved alveolus is the fourth, as is typical for an alligatorid, and that it is indeed an alveolus, there would be 15 maxillary teeth. The posterior maxillary teeth are rounded and slightly bulbous with the posteriormost preserved tooth being almost fungiform.

The robust pterygoids are roughly trapezoidal in ventral view and wider posteriorly than anteriorly, and form the entire posterior margin of the suborbital fenestrae. The pterygoids completely surround the choanae in Chinatichampsus. These choanae project anteroventrally and have posterior edges that have raised because of a surrounding concavity. A deep notch bisects the posterior edge. The choanal septum is not visible in lateral view.

Both Chitanichampsus and the slightly more derived Eocaiman share several characters plesiomorphic for crown-caimanines and Necrosuchus including the presence of posterior maxillary processes between the lacrimal and prefrontal, an extension of the quadratojugal with the dorsal angle of the infratemporal fenestra, and a small supraoccipital exposure on the skull table. It can be differentiated from Eocaiman because of the rounded shape of the expanded anterior margins of the palatines, rather than the quadrangular anterior margins of Eocaiman. Taxonomy Chinatichampsus was originally believed to have affinities with the Alligatorinae, partly based on comparisons with a currently undescribed alligatorid. In contrast, the phylogeny of Stocker, Brochu and Kirk (2021) found Chinatichampsus to be one of the most basal caimanines, branching off before Protocaiman, but after Brachychampsa, Stangerochampsa and Albertochampsa''.

Below is a phylogenetic tree by Stocker, Brochu & Kirk (2021):

References 

Alligatoridae
Fossil taxa described in 2021
Prehistoric pseudosuchian genera